Robin Galloway (born 18 December 1961) is a Scottish radio and TV broadcaster currently on air at Pure Radio Scotland as breakfast host. Robin hosts the Robin Galloway Breakfast Show on Pure Radio weekday mornings from 06:00 and is also Group Head Of Radio Presentation for DCT Media which is owned by DC Thomson.  Pure Radio Scotland launched on 26 November 2019 on DAB Digital radio, broadcasting to the cities of Glasgow and Edinburgh; also available via app and Smart Speaker. 
From 2014 to 31 May 2019, Robin was the breakfast radio presenter for Heart Scotland. Heart Breakfast with Robin and Adele aired every weekday from 6am-10am. Robin is currently the breakfast host for Pure Radio Scotland since November 2019. The station launched on Wednesday 27 November 2019 at 8am. Pure Radio Scotland is available online, on smart speakers and on DAB. Pure Radio Scotland currently has 3 former Heart Scotland presenters including Robin Galloway (formerly Heart Breakfast with Robin & Adele) and Paul Harper and Lynne Hogan (formerly Heart Drivetime with Paul & Lynne)

Career
Robin Galloway began his career in March 1983 as a presenter for Northsound Radio in Aberdeen. While working at the station, he joined Grampian Television (now STV North) as a continuity announcer and newsreader. Robin presented a number of regional programmes for the station including feedback series Put It In Writing (1991–94), and Grampian's local & networked contributions for the ITV Telethons, and at Clyde 1 during 1993. During the Summer 1996, Robin was short- listed for the role of new male presenter in a revamp of Channel 4's The Big Breakfast, but failed to get the job

Scot FM and KEY 103
Robin left Grampian in 1995 to work on the breakfast show for the Central Scotland regional station Scot FM, which saw his rating increase by nearly 400%, helping boost SCOT FM. Robin left the station in March 1997 after a series of clashes with then Programme director Jeff Graham. Robin originally planned to work out the remaining time after handing in his notice, but Scot FM bosses replaced him within days and concupiscence forced him to sign the agreement which banned him for taking any new jobs in Scotland. Scot FM insisted on a gagging order. Later that year, Robin moved to Manchester to presented Drivertime show on Key 103 with stints at 100.4 Jazz FM, During this time, he also presented for Granada Sky Broadcasting and Discovery.

In March 1999 Robin started presenting a Sunday lunchtime show on Scot FM from his new home studio in Manchester which was paid for by Scot FM, his studio was also used present a Saturday morning show on Northsound 1 and Overnight slot on Century 105.

Return to Scot FM Breakfast show 
In December 2000 he became the Scot FM breakfast DJ for the second time, and by May 2001 he had increased his Listenership by 55%. He was joined on breakfast by Marie-Clair, Robin also created a number of Characters and sketches for the Scot FM show,

 Cecil & Sandy: Two hairdresser from the shop Curlup and Die on Balshagme Avenue, 
 Winston: A Jamaican with no morals,
 Shug the Schemie: Shug the salesman comes into the studio daily with his 'special offers' of dodgy goods. 
 Old Mrs Galloway and Hector Brocklebank from the wind up calls.

In June 2001, the Guardian Media Group acquired Scot FM from previous owners, the Wireless Group, this resulted in a major overhaul of the station including an on-air rebrand. Real Radio Scotland began broadcasting at 8am on Tuesday 8 January 2002 with Robin having the honour of opening the station, and introducing the first song to be played, A Star is Born. Not all of his Non Wind up Characters carried over to Real Radio. Marie-Clair left in January 2004 and was replaced by Cat Harvey, who become Robin's new Co-host.

Since 2004, Galloway has written a weekly column for The Scottish Sun, which is published every Friday.

Clyde 
After being Real Radio Scotland Breakfast DJ for ten years, Galloway left the station in November 2010 shortly after an incident in which his producer ran in the nude past Labour Party leader Ed Miliband while he was being interviewed - despite Miliband defending them.

In January 2011, Galloway rejoined Clyde 1 in Glasgow to present the station's weekday drivetime show. In addition, Galloway began presenting a Sunday morning show on 9 October 2011 for the Bauer Scotland network of FM stations including Clyde 1, Forth One, Tay FM, Northsound 1, 96.7 West FM and MFR.

In June 2013, Bauer, the owners of Clyde, announced that Robin was moving over to the AM frequency to start a new networked breakfast show for Clyde 2, Forth 2, Northsound 2, Tay AM and West Sound, as part of its audience growth plans.  A Bauer spokesperson said: "His new show is an integral part of Bauer Media’s plans to bring the very best programming and content to audiences across the whole of Scotland, whilst also retaining, producing and broadcasting local news, sport, traffic and travel and ‘what’s on’ information from each of the local Greatest Hits Network stations it serves: Clyde 2, Forth 2, Northsound 2, Tay AM and West Sound.".

Robin Galloway, said:"Right now I'm pinching myself. To host a brand new breakfast show for Scotland is not only an honour but way beyond my wildest dreams. Of course, as I'll be rising in the middle of the night, that's it for the dreaming.  The new show will feature some of my signature segments plus brand new features, the greatest hits and of course everything you need to start your day.  It really will be the most entertainment you can have with your clothes on - if you know what I mean."

His last day on Clyde 1 Drive time show was 6 June 2013, with the breakfast show starting on Monday 1 July. His network Sunday show continued, to broadcast to Bauer Radio Scottish FM stations until early October 2014.

Heart 
On 20 October 2014, it was announced Robin Galloway was joining as new breakfast show host for Heart Scotland. He replaced Ewen Cameron, who left the station to pursue other opportunities.

On 31 May 2019, Galloway presented his final edition of the breakfast show.

Pure Radio 
On 28 October 2019, it was announced Robin Galloway was being hired to become the new breakfast show host for Pure Radio Scotland. Pure Radio launched at 8am on Wednesday 27 November 2019 with the Robin Galloway Breakfast Show. The current scheduled for the weekday includes Robin Galloway from 6am-10am. Ex-Heart Presenter Lynne Hoggan from 10am-1pm. Former Heart Presenter, Paul Harper from 1pm-4pm. Former Clyde 1 Presenter, Amber Zoe from 4pm-7pm and The Shy Guy from 10pm-1am.

The Robin Galloway Breakfast Show consists of Robin Galloway, Rory Barraclough, and Alannah MacKenzie.

The Breakfast Show includes a £5,000 competition where a contestant has to get all three answers matched with either Rory or Alannah, dependent on who the contestant chooses. If they get three answers right and they match, the contestant will win £5,000.

Wind ups
A long-standing feature of Galloway's radio shows were his wind-up phone calls, first heard on Northsound 1,  before becoming a fixture on Scot FM shows and Real Radio Scotland's breakfast show. Annual compilation CDs of the wind-up calls were released, with the 2007 edition achieving Gold sales status.

In December 2012, Galloway decided to give the segment a hiatus as a mark of respect to nurse Jacintha Saldanha, who committed suicide after being on the receiving end of an Australian radio show's prank call. Robin admitted a few years later in 2015, he was deeply affected by the tragedy. In November 2015 the wind up calls were brought back to his Breakfast show titled the "8:10 Phone Tap".  This was on his weekday show called "Heart Breakfast Scotland with Robin and Adele". Some calls Adele featured in as well as Robin.
Robin decided to stop wind ups on Heart. After leaving Heart and joining Pure Scotland, It was announced that The Real Wind Up will be brought back. However, it is now renamed from The Real Wind Up to The Pure Wind Up!

Awards

Arqiva Broadcast of the Year 2015
Bronze: Referendum Live – Robin Galloway Bauer Scotland
In 1999, Galloway won Gold at The New York Radio festivals, For the Best Breakfast show in the world
 Ace award for World's Best Local Radio Personality. 
 Two British radio awards.

References

External links
Robin Galloway.com Official site
Clyde 1 website

Scottish radio presenters
Radio and television announcers
Living people
1961 births